Craig McKay (born 21 June 1973, Guiseley, Leeds, West Yorkshire, England) is an English actor well known for playing the part of Mark Hughes in ITV soap opera Emmerdale from 1988 until 1993, when his character was killed off in the famous Plane Crash storyline on New Year's Eve 1993.

Craig is the real life brother of former Emmerdale actress Glenda McKay who played his on-screen sister Rachel.

External links
 

1973 births
Living people
English male soap opera actors
People from Guiseley
Male actors from Leeds